Lina Lossen (born Caroline Elisabeth Lossen; 7 October 1878 – 30 January 1959) was a German stage and film actress.

Selected filmography
 Peer Gynt (1919)
 The Forbidden Way (1920)
 Miss Julie (1922)
 Love's Finale (1925)
 Tragedy (1925)
 The Trial of Donald Westhof (1927)
 To New Shores (1937)
 Serenade (1937)
 Friedemann Bach (1941)

References

Bibliography
 Soister, John T. Conrad Veidt on Screen: A Comprehensive Illustrated Filmography. McFarland, 2002.

External links

1878 births
1959 deaths
German stage actresses
German film actresses
German silent film actresses
20th-century German actresses
Actors from Dresden